Gustaw Lewita (1853-1889) was a pianist from Płock, Poland.  He attended the Vienna Conservatory and graduated with distinction, before heading to Paris.  There he became a member of the orchestra of the Pas de Loup concerts.  In 1882, he became a professor at the Warsaw Conservatory.  He later gave concerts to Archduke Franz Karl in Vienna and to the Emperor of Brazil, during his later American tour.

References

1853 births
1889 deaths
Jewish classical musicians
Polish classical pianists
Male classical pianists
Polish musicians
Burials at Père Lachaise Cemetery
19th-century classical pianists
19th-century male musicians